Secreted Ly-6/uPAR-related protein 1 is a protein that in humans is encoded by the SLURP1 gene. It exerts anti-inflammatory effects, acts as a tumor suppressor, and antagonizes nicotinic receptors.

Function 

The protein encoded by this gene is a member of the Ly6/uPAR family but lacks a GPI-anchoring signal sequence. It is secreted into the blood and is also sometimes found in semen when extracted into the female zygote which binds to the α7-acetylcholine receptor. It is shown to act as an endogenous tumor suppressor by reducing cell migration and invasion by mediating its own anti-tumor effect and by antagonizing the pro-malignant effects of nicotine.

Mutations in this gene have been associated with Mal de Meleda, a rare autosomal recessive skin disorder characterized by an inflammatory palmoplantar hyperkeratosis. This is the consequence of a loss of SLURP1 which leads to a dysfunctional epithelial differentiation and an increased secretion of the inflammatory cytokines TNFα, IL1, IL-6, and IL-8.

This gene maps to the same chromosomal region as several members of the Ly6/uPAR family of glycoprotein receptors.

References

Further reading